Nouyarn Island is an uninhabited Baffin Island offshore island located in the Arctic Archipelago in the territory of Nunavut. The island lies in Frobisher Bay, southeast of Hamlen Bay, and south of the Hall Peninsula tip. Islands in the immediate vicinity include Gabriel Island and McLean Island to the west, as well as Chase Island to the northwest.

References

Uninhabited islands of Qikiqtaaluk Region
Islands of Frobisher Bay